Stuart Michael Sharrett (born July 18, 1965) is an American actor. Best known for his role in the 1978 family movie The Magic of Lassie with James Stewart, Sharrett additionally co-starred in the 1985 action film Savage Dawn and in the 1986 Wes Craven horror film Deadly Friend, for which he received a Young Artist Award nomination as the "Best Young Actor in a Horror Motion Picture".

Biography and career
Sharrett was born in Ventura, California. Sharrett began his career at the age of 12 in the Emmy Award-winning Our Town, a 1977 television adaptation of the classic play Our Town. On February 20, 1978, Sharrett guest starred on Little House on the Prairie on the episode entitled "The Stranger" about young Peter Lundstrom, who is expelled from his private school for petty theft, so his wealthy father sends the boy to stay with Uncle Nels Oleson in Walnut Grove for a long-overdue lesson in values. At first he rebels but later on learns the pride of hard work and in time his father later realizes that his time with his son is much more important than making any more money as he is already quite wealthy already. After some additional television roles and a part in the 1978 Walt Disney comedy western film Hot Lead and Cold Feet, Sharrett landed the role of Chris, the grandson of Clovis, played by Academy Award winner Jimmy Stewart in the 1978 musical film The Magic of Lassie. In  The Magic of Lassie, Lassie is a dog owned by Sharrett's freckled-faced character Chris. Lassie is taken away from Chris, who then is put under pressure when his grandpa has to decide whether to sell the valuable family vineyard in return for the dog.

In 1986, Sharrett played Tom in the witty sci-fi/horror movie Deadly Friend. In the teenage friendship story, Tom and his friend Paul bring friend Samantha back to life using a computer chip designed by Paul. Reviews of Sharrett's performance were positive, with a New York Times reviewer writing, "As Tom, Michael Sharrett is a wonderful foil, fainting away at the first kick of Sam's supposedly dead leg." For his performance as Tom, Sharrett received a Young Artist Award nomination in 1986 as the Best Young Actor in a Horror Motion Picture.

In 1988, Sharrett appeared in the short-lived TV series Supercarrier. Two years later, in October 1990, Sharrett served as a main character in an episode of the American television drama The Trials of Rosie O'Neill. In that episode, Sharrett played a seemingly all-American boy accused of desecrating a Jewish cemetery. Rosie, a Los Angeles public defender character played by Sharon Gless in the series, defends Sharrett's character. The episode first aired on Monday, October 22 on CBS.

Selected filmography

Films

Television

References

Bibliography
 Holmstrom, John. The Moving Picture Boy: An International Encyclopaedia from 1895 to 1995. Norwich, Michael Russell, 1996, p. 356.

External links 
 

1965 births
Living people
American male child actors
American male film actors
American male television actors
People from Ventura, California